Nirmala Mishra (21 October 1938 – 31 July 2022) was an Indian singer of predominantly Bengali and Odia film songs. She also sang popular Assamese songs, most notably "Ki Naam di Matin". She was a recipient of the Sangeet Sudhakar Balakrushna Das Award as an honour for her lifetime contribution to Odia music.

Early life and family 
Mishra was born in Majilpur, as the daughter of Pandit Mohinimohana Mishra and Bhabani Devi on the eve of Durga Saptami. Later for her father's job, her family settled down in Chetla of Kolkata. There was a musical environment in her family. Father Pandit Mohinimohan Mishra and elder brother Murarimohan Mishra, both were famous singers. Her family title was Bandopadhyay (Banerjee). Later her family was awarded the title of 'Mishra'. Her father was also awarded the titles of 'Pandit', 'Sangitratna', and 'Sangitnayak' on behalf of 'Kashi Sangit Samaj'.

Career 
Music director Balakrushna Das gave her a chance to sing a song in 1960 for the first time in the Odia movie Shri Lokanath. Some of the hit Odia movies in which she has sung are: Stree, Kaa, Malajanha, Abhinetree, Anutap, Kie Kaahaara, Amadaa Baata, and Adina Megha.

Honours and awards 
 Balakrushna Das Award

References

External links 
 
 Nirmala Mishra: Odia Music Songs Collection

1938 births
2022 deaths
Singers from West Bengal
Indian women playback singers
Indian women singer-songwriters
Indian singer-songwriters
20th-century Indian singers
20th-century Indian women singers
Women musicians from West Bengal
People from Jaynagar Majilpur